Stape is a hamlet and civil parish in the Ryedale district of North Yorkshire, England. At the 2011 Census the population was less than 100; details are included in the civil parish of Cropton. The population was estimated to be 120 in 2015 by the local authority.

To the south-west of the village, a Roman Road runs across Flamborough Rigg, through the village and across the moors to the north. It is thought that the road is Wade's Causeway, which connected the Roman camps at Malton and Cawthorne with the east coast.

Also to the south west is the Keldy Castle estate, which was requisitioned from the Reckitt Family during the Second World War as an army camp. The castle (actually a stately home with crenellated walls) was destroyed in 1950 after being declared surplus to the requirements of the owners. In 1976, the Forestry Commission installed holiday homes on the site.

There was an activity centre, known as the Ken Ather Outdoor Centre, built for use by pupils of the village until closed by what was then the North Riding Education Authority. It was run by the Joseph Rowntree Trust and often used by Joseph Rowntree School, New Earswick, York until 2016, when administrative problems made it too difficult to retain.

Stape is home to the Stape Silver Band, which was formed in Newtondale in 1884. The band have been featured in the ITV series "Heartbeat" twice in 1994 and 2008. In 2010, the band reached the finals of the National Brass Band Competition which was held in Harrogate.

References

External links

History of Stape Silver Band
Images of Keldy Castle before it was 'lost'

Villages in North Yorkshire
Civil parishes in North Yorkshire